Andrew Saunders is an expert in artillery fortifications and Chief Inspector of Ancient Monuments and Historic Buildings.

Andrew Saunders may also refer to:

Andy Saunders (author), English author and researcher
Andy Saunders (rugby league) (born 1994), Australian rugby league footballer
Andy Sanders (musician), guitarist of Electric Guitars and touring member of Tears for Fears, often wrongly credited as Andrew Saunders

See also
Drew Saunders (disambiguation)